The Constitution (Amendment No. 21) Act 1933 (act no. 41 of 1933, previously bill no. 48 of 1933) was an Act of the Oireachtas of the Irish Free State amending the Constitution of the Irish Free State which had been adopted in 1922. It abolished the right of the Governor General to refuse to sign a Bill passed by the Oireachtas. It was part of a series of constitutional changes the Fianna Fáil government led by Éamon de Valera had initiated after coming to office in 1932 which diminished the role of the Governor-General, culminating in the removal of the position in the Constitution (Amendment No. 27) Act 1936.

It amended Article 41 by the deletion of the words struck out below:

The Act became obsolete on the repeal of the 1922 Constitution on the adoption of the Constitution of Ireland in 1937, and was repealed by the Statute Law Revision Act 2016.

References

1933 in Irish law
Acts of the Oireachtas of the 1930s
Amendments to the Constitution of the Irish Free State
Monarchy in the Irish Free State